S. P. Venkatesh (also credited as Sangeetharajan; born 5 March 1955) is an Indian music director and composer who primarily works in Malayalam films. He was at his prime in the late 80s and 90s, being reputed for his background scores and songs in Malayalam cinema.

Career
Venkatesh's father Pazhani was an accomplished Mandolin player. Earlier in his life, he played guitar, banjo and mandolin, and was an assistant musical director to Shyam and Raveendran during his early days. He was introduced into the Malayalam film industry by Dennis Joseph, with his first break coming in the film Rajavinte Makan, directed by Thampi Kannanthanam. The film and the songs in it were big hits, and Venkatesh subsequently became a regular collaborator of Thampi's, resulting in a series of hit musical albums during the 1990s. His most well-known film scores include Indrajaalam, Kilukkam, Minnaram, Spadikam, Dhruvam, Kauravar, Johnnie Walker, Kizhakkan Pathrose, and Hitler.

He has also handled the orchestration for many other music directors. He composed background scores for films for which songs were composed by other composers, such as Devasuram  He has also scored for some Bollywood and Bengali films.

In 1993, he won the Kerala State Film Award for Best Music Director for his work in Paithrukam and Janam. Filmfare Award for Best Music Director for his work in Paithrukam

In 1999, he notably recorded nine songs in a single day for the unreleased Tamil film Ithu Mudivithillai starring Babu Ganesh and Vichithra.

Style and orchestration
Venkatesh's song compositions feature extensive use of acoustic guitar, bass guitar and violin orchestra, and his background scores feature synth-based orchestra fused with traditional strings. He also used symphonic style strings orchestration in most of his songs.

Filmography

Malayalam films 
  spadikam 4k (2022)
 Aanandha Bhairavi (Tamil&Hindi) 2020 Music 
 Velleppam (2020) (songs, bgm)
 Ek Don ki Prem Kahani  (2020, Music)
 Thomson Villa (2014, music)
 Ginger (2013, music)
 9 KK Road (2010, music)
 Koottukar (2010, music)
 Patham Nilayile Theevandi (2009, music)
 Bharya Onnu Makkal Moonnu (2009, background)
 Detective (2007)
 Pathaka (2006) (background music)
 Kilukkam Kilukilukkam (2006)
 Pandippada (2005) (background music)
 Iruvattam Manavaatti (2005) (background music)
 Junior Senior (2005) (background music)
 Mambazhakalam (2004) (Background music)
 Runway (2004) (background music)
 Vajram (2004) (background music)
 Agninakshathram (2004) (background music)
 Maratha Nadu (2004) (background music)
 hungama(hindi)2003 bgm
 Jagathi Jagathish in Town (2002)
 Videsi Nair Swadesi Nair (2002)
 Level Cross (2001)
 Kakkakuyil (background music) (2001)
 Dubai (2001) (background music)
 Aayiram Meni (1999)
 Vazhunnor (1999) (background music)
 Alibabayum Arara Kallanmarum (1998) (background music)
 Amma Ammayiamma (1998) (background music)
 Mayajalam (1998)
 Oro Viliyum Kathorthu (1998)
 Bhoopathi (1997, music)
 Maasmaram (1997, music)
 Virasat (Hindi/1997)(background music)
 Ekkareyanente Manasam (1997)
 Hitler Brothers (1997, music)
 Lelam (1997) (background music)
 Nagarapuranam (1997)
 Superman (1997, music)
 Swarnakireedam (1996, music)
 Kaathil Oru Kinnaram (1996)
 Swapna Lokathe Balabhaskaran (1996, music)
 Aadyathe Kanmani (1995) (Also for the Kannada remake: Muddina Kanmani (1997))
 Aniyan Bava Chetan Bava (1995, music)
 Avittam Thirunaal Aarogya Sriman (1995)
 Kalamasseriyil Kalyanayogam (1995) (background music)
 Kidilol Kidilam (1995, music)
 Kusruthikaatu (1995) (background music)
 ‘’chandralekha’’ (1997)
 Manthrikam (1995)
 Puthukkottayile Puthumanavalan (1995, music)
 Sphadikam (1995)
 Mannar Mathai Speaking (1995/music)
 Highway (1995/music)
 Vishnu (1994) (background music)
 Bheesmacharya (1994/music)
 Kambolam (1994/music)
 Kashmeeram (1994) (background music)
 Minnaram (1994/music)
 Pidakkozhi Koovunna Noottandu (1994/music)
Kabooliwala (1994/music)
Gandharvam (1993/Music)
 Sainyam (1993/music)
 Paithrukam (1993/music)
 Sopanam
 Valsalyam (1993/music)
 Dhruvam (1993/music)
 Vendar danialState Licency  (1993/music)
 Customs Diary (1993) (background music)
 Ethu Manju Kaalam (1993)
 Injakkadan Mathai & Sons (1993/music)
 Janam (1993/music)
 Journalist (1993/music)
 Devaasuram (1993) (background music)
 Pravachakan (1993/music)
 Sowbhagyam (1993/music)
 Sthreedhanam (1993/music)
 Daddy (1992/Music)
 Johnnie Walker (1992)
 Kouravar (1992)
 Kizhakkan Pathrose (1992/music)
 Mahanagaram (1992) (background music)
 Ennodishtam Koodamo (1992)
 Kaazhchakkppuram (1992) (background music)
 Cheppadividya (1992/Music)
 Nadodi (1992/music)
 Kilukkam (1991/music)
 Thudar Katha (1991/music)
 Koodikazhca (1991/music)
 Kuttettan (1990)
 Appu (1990) (background music)
 No.20 Madras Mail (1990) (background music)
 Indrajaalam (1990/music)
 Vyooham (1990)
 Mahayanam (1989) (background music)
 Douthyam (1989)
 Puthiya Karukkal (1989/music)
 Bhoomiyile Rajakkanmar (1987/music)
 Naradhan Keralathil (1987)
 P. C. 369 (1987)
 Vazhiyorakkazhchakal (1987/music)
 Vilambaram (1987)
 Rareeram (1986) (background music)
 Rajavinte Makan (1986/music)
 Desatanakkili Karayarilla (background music)
 Vivahitare Itihile (1986)
 Janakeeya Kodathi (1985)

Tamil films
Otru (2021)
Tiruppur (2010) (Background music only)
Unakkaga En Kadhal (2010) (Background music only)
Mandabam (2010) (Background music only)
Pinju Manasu (2009) (Background music only)
Kasimedu Govindan (2008) (Background music only)
Muni (2007) (Background music only)
Iruvar Mattum (2006) (Background music only)
Remote (2004)
Bheeshmar (2003)
Vadakku Vaasal (2003)
Ammaiyappa (2002)
Game (2002)
Nee Enthan Vaanam (2000)
Adutha Kattam (1999)
Maru Visaranai (1995)
Idhuthanda Sattam (1992)
Theechatti Govindan (1991)
Vigneshwar (1991)
Nanbargal (1991)
Salem Vishnu (1990)
Pathimoonam Number Veedu (1990)
Paattali Magan (1990)
En Kanavar (1989)
Kaaval Poonaigal (1989)
Poovukkul Boogambam (1988)

Kannada films
Veera Ranachandi (2017)
Suli (2016)
Aithalakkadi (2010) (BGM only)
Amrutha Vani (2007) (BGM only)
Z (1999) (BGM only)
Nilukada Nakshatra (1995)
Muddina Kanmani (1996)
Megha Mandara (1992)
Aragini (1992)
Hosa Raaga (1992)
Keralida Kesari (1991)
Sundarakanda (1991)
Ashwamedha (1990)
Ekalavya (1990)
Panchama Veda (1990)
Poli Kitty (1990)
Sharavegada Saradara (1989)
prema yuddha-1981
Madhuri (1989)

Bengali films

Hindi films
Kyon Ki (2005) (Background Score Only)
Hungama (2003) (Background Score Only)
Yeh Teraa Ghar Yeh Meraa Ghar (2001) (Background Score Only)
Virasat (1997) (Background Score Only)
Gardish (1993) (Background Score Only)
Muskurahat (1992) (Background Score Only)

References

External links
 
www.gomolo.in profile
www.citwf.com profile
 SP Venkitesh at MSI

Music directors
Indian guitarists
Living people
Filmfare Awards South winners
1955 births
Malayalam film score composers
Tamil film score composers
Kannada film score composers